Castelo do Bode Dam is a concrete arch-gravity dam on the Zêzere River, a tributary of the Tagus River, located southwest of Tomar and north of Constância, in Santarém District, Portugal. It is one of the tallest structures in Portugal. The dam was constructed between 1945 and 1951. It also supports a 138 MW hydroelectric power station which was commissioned between 1951 and 1952.

References

Dams in Portugal
Hydroelectric power stations in Portugal
Dams completed in 1951
Arch-gravity dams
Energy infrastructure completed in 1952
Buildings and structures in Santarém District
1952 establishments in Portugal